Your Song is a digital extended play by Australian pop singer Guy Sebastian. It features live versions of four songs from his 2007 soul covers album The Memphis Album, and an additional two extra covers. It was released on 6 December 2007 on Sony BMG.

Track listing

References

Guy Sebastian albums
2007 EPs